The men's road race at the 1992 UCI Road World Championships was the 59th edition of the event. The race took place on Sunday 6 September 1992 in Benidorm, Spain. The race was won by Gianni Bugno of Italy.

Final classification

References

Men's Road Race
UCI Road World Championships – Men's road race